|}

|}

The Rathbarry & Glenview Studs Hurdle is a Grade 2 National Hunt hurdle race in Ireland which is open to horses aged five years or older. 
It is run at Fairyhouse over a distance of 2 miles and 4 furlongs (4,023 metres), and it is scheduled to take place each year at the Easter meeting.

The race was first run in 2011. It was sponsored by Keelings fruit growers until the 2019 running and in 2021 by Underwriting Exchange. Since 2022 the sponsors are Rathbarry & Glenview Studs.

Records
Leading jockey (2 wins):
 Tony McCoy –  Get Me Out Of Here (2012), Dressedtothenines (2013) 
 Paul Townend -  Thousand Stars (2014), Coquin Mans (2018) 

Leading trainer  (4 wins):
 Willie Mullins -  Thousand Stars (2014), Renneti (2017), Coquin Mans (2018), Stormy Ireland (2021)

Winners

See also
 Horse racing in Ireland
 List of Irish National Hunt races

References
Racing Post

National Hunt races in Ireland
National Hunt hurdle races
Fairyhouse Racecourse
Recurring sporting events established in 2011
2011 establishments in Ireland